The Rover 10 was a small family car from the British Rover car company produced between 1927 and 1947.


10/25

The Rover 10/25 was a small car built by Rover from mid 1927. Some time between March and September 1927 Rover increased the bore of their 9/20hp by 3 mm and renamed the model 10/25 hp to indicate the engine's 10 per cent increased capacity but 25 per cent increase in claimed output. The drive  shaft was also enclosed. The Rover 9/20 remained available in showrooms.

Chassis
With the Rover 8 and Rover 9/20 chassis and enlarged 9/20 engine the 10/25 chassis was conventional with rigid axles and leaf spring suspension all round, half elliptic at the front and quarter elliptic behind. The four cylinder, overhead valve engine's  capacity had been increased by ten per cent to 1185 cc. Drive was to the rear wheels through a three speed gearbox. There were internally expanding brakes on all four wheels. Its magneto ignition was replaced by coil ignition in 1929.

Weymann body
Available bodies either 2-seater or 4-seater were: open tourer or semi-sports tourer or as a 4-seater saloon.

The 4-seater saloons were provided with a Weymann fabric body built by Rover under licence at Parkside. A standard Paris body with a folding roof was rebranded Riviera.  The saloon windows were given double sliding panels for ventilation.

Equipment in the Paris body included: leather upholstery, five lamps, two electric horns, eight-day clock, automatic screen wiper, roof ventilator and lamp, companions, rear blind controllable from the driver’s seat, folding luggage grid etc. The Riviera model had the same fittings but in addition the roof was flexible. It folded back like an ordinary hood over about two-thirds of its length.

In October 1928 the bonnet was lengthened and a Weymann Sportsman's Coupé was added to the range. Seating four it had two 40 inch doors.

A high-line Regal model available on all bodies was introduced in 1928.  Priced at a 12 per cent premium it came with a sliding roof, bumpers (buffers) front and rear, safety glass, vacuum servo braking, two spare wheels and special mats.

All-steel body
The existing Weymann bodied Riviera and Sportsman's Coupé models were joined in August 1930 by a "coachbuilt" model. Pressed Steel supplied these all-steel bodies to Rover, painted and trimmed, for a much lower price than the cost of Rover's in-house Weymann bodies but Rover charged the same price for the three models fully equipped with safety glass windscreen, an electric windscreen wiper and a luggage grid. The bodies were new, roomier and they had a new shape. Wire wheels were £5 extra.

Unacknowledged relatives

Family 10
Announced in August 1930 the steel safety saloon, with safety glass windscreen, continued alongside the Weymann saloon and Weymann Sportsman's Coupé all given a new name but still the same car on the same old Rover 8 chassis though with improved rear suspension. Its half-elliptic springs replaced the previous car's quarter-elliptics. The Family Ten would continue after July 1932 alongside the new redesigned-under-the-skin 10 Special. Sliding roof, cam steering and a new type radiator stone guard of improved appearance were improvements the Family 10 shared with the new Special. The 10 Special's 4-speed gearbox was available as an optional extra.

Road test
The correspondent of The Times reported the smooth and quiet steel saloon would reach 46 mph on the straight. Once under way the acceleration was satisfying. The large bonnet and small engine made for easy access to components.  The controls were good, the steering light and steady, the brakes effective. There were one or two body squeaks.

In February 1932 "following a reorganisation of the company's management" Rover announced strengthening of the Family Ten chassis by using heavier gauge material and re-designed cross members to improve torsional rigidity. These improvements were, they said, the outcome of lengthy testing on New Zealand's and Australia's roughest roads carried out to make the cars suitable for overseas use. Petrol was now supplied from the tank by Autovac. A four-speed gearbox with quiet third was standard on the de luxe car and optional on the others. Brakes and springing had also been improved. There were detail improvements in the de luxe car now trimmed in hide.

10 Special—new chassis
An all new chassis with four speed gearbox, freewheel, automatic restart, bigger brakes, automatic clutch spiral bevel final drive and other facilities for the driver but bearing the same Pressed Steel body and, for the moment, the same engine was announced in July 1932. It was sold alongside the Family Ten for a 17 per cent premium.

The engine was now supported at just three not four points using special rubber insulation to control noise and vibration. Rover's—as it was promoted— Easy-free gear change was a new 4-speed gearbox with constant mesh double-helical gears for 2nd and 3rd and a freewheel device with its control beside the driver. A further convenience was an optional extra power-controlled or automatic clutch. A Startix automatic engine starter was fitted. Startix was activated when the ignition was switched on and, in addition, operated automatically if the engine stalled. The new change-speed system meant gears might be changed after a slight easing of the accelerator without using the clutch yet making no noise. A knob on the instrument panel switched of the freewheel and returned the gearbox to orthodox. The half-elliptic spring on both axles are controlled by hydraulic shock-absorbers. The freewheel was to remain a feature of Rovers for more than 20 years.

The freewheel transmission placed more reliance on the braking system. The new brakes were Lockheed hydraulic with large diameter drums, they were self-compensating and self-lubricating. Rover's "silent coachwork". Special plant was installed at Rover's works to spray the inside of all body panels with asbestos to ensure quietness fire-proofing etc and insulation from extremes of heat and cold.

The body was mounted on a sub-frame with ample insulating material between frame and body. Body joints received treatment to avoid squeaks and the doors were fitted with silencers

"Specialised bodies by leading coach builders" available on all chassis, ordered from The Rover Company
 Carbodies Nizam semi-sports 2-seater
 Whittingham & Mitchel Rajah semi-sports 4-seater
 Grose Grose drophead coupé
 Geo Maddox & Sons Ranee foursome coupé drophead
 Charlesworth Bodies Pirate fixed head foursome coupé
 Weymann Motor Bodies Maharajah 4-door semi-sports saloon
 Salmons & Sons Tickford saloon
 Swallow Bodies Swallow four-door saloon
 Pressed Steel PSC Special

Rover 10 P1 1933–1938

The 1933 10 announced in the autumn of 1933 was really a new car with new underslung chassis and new 1389 cc engine. It was the first car to be developed by Rover after the Wilks brothers Spencer and younger brother Maurice joined the company. The car was relatively expensive at GBP238 - the Austin 10 was GBP168 - and reflected the new company policy of moving upmarket rather than chasing volume. The Pressed Steel body was continued but there were no more fabric bodied models. Chassis were also supplied to a wide range of external coachbuilders.

The engine was flexibly mounted in the chassis to reduce vibration and a freewheel device was fitted to help gear changing on the non-synchromesh gearbox and save fuel, a 15% improvement in economy was claimed. The freewheel would continue to be a feature of some Rovers until 1959.

Rover 10 P2 1939–1947

The final version of the 10 was launched in 1939. This was part of the Rover P2 range, along with Rover 12, Rover 14, Rover 16 and Rover 20 models. The chassis was slightly modified getting an extra half inch (12 mm) in the wheelbase and the engine got a new cylinder head increasing power from 44 to 48 bhp. Synchromesh was fitted to the top two ratios on the gearbox. The body was restyled in the Rover style of the time. The price was now GBP275 for the saloon but few were made before the outbreak of war and production stopping in 1940.

The Coventry factory was damaged by bombing in November 1940 and when production restarted it was from the new Solihull works. The cars were little changed but a left hand drive version to help the export drive arrived in 1947 along with an optional heater.

The final cars were made in 1947.

Notes

References

 The Rover Story. Graham Robson. 1977. Patrick Stephens Ltd. 
 The Rover Ten. Jonathan Wood. The Automobile June 1999. ISSN 0955-1328

External links 
 

10
1930s cars
Cars introduced in 1927
1940s cars